The 2021–22 Baltic Men Volleyball League, known as Credit 24 Champions League for sponsorship reasons, was the 17th edition of the highest level of club volleyball in the Baltic states.

Participating teams

The following teams participate in the 2020–21 edition of Baltic Men Volleyball League.

Venues, personnel and kits

Coaching changes

Regular season
All participating 9 clubs are playing according to the double round robin system.

|}
Updated to match(es) played on 13 February 2022. Source: Credit24 Champions League Regular Season

Playoffs
The four winners of each series qualify to the Final four, while the other four teams are eliminated.

Final four
Organizer: Bigbank Tartu 
Venue: A. Le Coq Sports Hall, Tartu, Estonia

Semifinals

|}

3rd place match

|}

Final

|}

Final ranking

Final four awards

Most Valuable Player
  Kert Toobal (Bigbank Tartu) 
Best Setter
  Dmytro Shlomin (Gargždai Amber-Arlanga)  
Best Outside Hitters
  Albert Hurt (Bigbank Tartu)
  Kevin Saar (TalTech)   

Best Middle Blockers
  Toms Švans (Pärnu)
  Mihkel Tanila (TalTech)
Best Opposite Hitter
  Valentin Kordas (Bigbank Tartu)  
Best Libero
  Silver Maar (Pärnu)

References

External links
Official website

Baltic Men Volleyball League
Baltic Men Volleyball League
Baltic Men Volleyball League
Baltic Men Volleyball League
Baltic Men Volleyball League
Baltic Men Volleyball League
Baltic Men Volleyball League
Baltic Men Volleyball League
Baltic Men Volleyball League
Baltic Men Volleyball League